Books of Mortals is a science fiction fantasy novel by American authors Ted Dekker and Tosca Lee. There is a short story prequel and three novels that cover the story of Rom Sebastian and his secret of life. The Keeper a short story prequel is only available as an eBook, however the three novels Forbidden, Mortal, and Sovereign are all available as hardback, paperback, as well as eBooks.

Plot

The Keeper
In a Russian wasteland two hermits, Pavel and Gustov have heard a horrible secret. As the two sit by a fire one night they are visited by Talus, a man with a secret to share with the two. He shares a secret so terrible that he must share it with those who will help him protect the knowledge that will one day save all of humanity.

Forbidden
Rom Sebastian is thrust into a situation that he never anticipated. A man, who is being chased by the Royal Guard, gives Rom a vial of blood and cryptic vellum before he dies. Rom discovers that the blood will give him life. Emotions that he has never felt before wash over him as he realizes that the whole world has been dead, but this blood gives life. He is joined by others who discover the same emotions after taking the blood. He will abandon everything he has ever known, and awaken humanity to true life and love. The blood also will introduce hatred, ambition and greed which will make it a difficult journey for Rom.

Mortal
Nine years ago, Rom discovered an ancient blood that brought people to life. He discovered a boy named Jonathan, “who has the true life flowing through his veins.” Jonathan is next in line to become Sovereign leader, but he must wait until his 18th birthday before he can ascend to the throne. Rom and the Mortals must protect Jonathan from the evil Saric. Saric has developed a lowly, foul smelling group called Dark Bloods to hunt down the Mortals. Saric has even revived his dead sister Feyn so that she can take the throne, and obey her brother’s demands.

Sovereign
A war torn world where the Immortals, the Dark Bloods and the Corpses, to the Sovereigns have fought for the supremacy of Earth, and the Sovereigns are losing numbers. Filled with the blood of Jonathan, Jordin becomes one of the leaders of the Sovereigns.  Although Jonathan is gone, his blood still heals and those that are healed become followers. Sovereigns are being hunted by Saric and Feyn, and they have to hide in abandoned mazes in the city. They have developed a virus that will kill their enemies, but Rom is convinced that killing Feyn goes against the teachings of Jonathan. Rom tries to bring Feyn to her senses, but Jordin has her own plan.  Jordin promises to bring the heads of Saric and Feyn, and the virus will not be spread immediately. It is a dangerous journey for Jordin and Kaya as they try and take advantage of their enemy in a desperate attempt for survival.

References

Novels by Ted Dekker
2013 American novels
American Christian novels
American thriller novels